William Henry Hardy (15/16 October 1831 – 20 December 1909) was a member of the Wisconsin State Assembly.

Biography
Hardy was born on October 15, 1831. He attended what was then Carroll College.

Career
Hardy was a member of the Assembly during the 1874 and 1876 sessions. Additionally, he chaired the town board (similar to city council) and was Town Clerk, Town Treasurer and Town Superintendent of Schools of Genesee, Wisconsin. He was a Democrat.

References

1831 births
1909 deaths
People from Genesee, Wisconsin
Carroll University alumni
Democratic Party members of the Wisconsin State Assembly
Wisconsin city council members
City and town clerks
City and town treasurers in the United States
School superintendents in Wisconsin
19th-century American politicians